District Vision is a running brand and wellness collective, based in Los Angeles. The company was founded by Tom Daly and Max Vallot in 2016.

Founders 

The founders met at a business school in London, after which Vallot worked for Saint Laurent and Daly for Acne Studios. They are both devoted runners and meditators. Through their Mindful Athlete Program, they collaborate with athletes and running clubs around the world to promote mental health.

Overview 
District Vision initially had 2 frames; Keiichi and Nagata. In 2017 they introduced 3 additional frames; Kaishiro Explorer, Nako Multisport and Yukari Windshield. They come in 4 lens variations; Sky G15 (full UV protection), Sports Yellow (for visibility in low light), Water Gray (polarized lenses to minimize glare from water) and Black Rose (changing light conditions). 

All frames are made out of nylon and titanium weighing 22 grams. The lenses are Polycarbonate which blocks UV rays and is resistant from impact, shatter and scratch. They have retail distribution in Dover Street Market in New York, and Barneys New York.

District Vision also introduced a holistic tool kit for runners besides their signature eyewear, including a performance sock line in collaboration with Falke. They work with athletes of all backgrounds and organise the Mindful Athlete program for Marathon participants.

Awards 
Gear Patrol 100: District Vision was selected as one of the best 100 products in 2016.
Runner's World Editor's Choice Award: Kaishiro as best new running sunglasses in 2017.

References 

Eyewear brands
Eyewear companies of the United States